Michael de la Pole, 1st Earl of Suffolk, 1st Baron de la Pole,  (c. 13305 September 1389) of Wingfield Castle in Suffolk, was an English financier and Lord Chancellor of England. His contemporary Froissart portrays de la Pole as a devious and ineffectual counsellor who dissuaded King Richard II from pursuing a certain victory against French and Scottish forces in Cumberland and fomented undue suspicion of that king's uncle John of Gaunt, 1st Duke of Lancaster.

Origins

He was the eldest son of Sir William de la Pole (died 1366), Chief Baron of the Exchequer, a wool merchant from Kingston upon Hull who after the collapse of the Florentine banker families of Bardi and Peruzzi emerged as the chief financier of King Edward III. His younger brother was Edmund de la Pole.

Career
Michael enjoyed even greater popularity at court than his father, becoming one of the most trusted and intimate friends of Edward's successor, Richard II. He was appointed Chancellor in 1383, and created Earl of Suffolk in 1385, the first of his family to hold any such title (the earldom had become extinct in 1382 on the death of William de Ufford). 

However, in the late 1380s his fortunes radically altered, in step with those of the king. During the Wonderful Parliament of 1386 he was impeached on charges of embezzlement and negligence, a victim of increasing tensions between Parliament and Richard. 

He was the first official in English history to be removed from office by the process of impeachment. Even after this disgrace, he remained in royal favour, although soon fell foul of the Lords Appellant. He was one of a number of Richard's associates accused of treason by the Appellants in November 1387.

Exile and death
After the Appellants' victory at Radcot Bridge (December 1387) and before the Merciless Parliament met in February 1388, de la Pole shrewdly fled to Paris, thus escaping the fate of Sir Nicholas Brembre and Chief Justice Robert Tresilian. He remained in France for the remainder of his life. Sentenced in his absence, his title and estates were stripped from him.

Marriage and children

He married Katherine Wingfield (1340–1386) daughter and heiress of Sir John de Wingfield (d. circa 1361) of Wingfield Castle in Suffolk, chief administrator to Edward the Black Prince (father of King Richard II), by whom he had eight children:
Michael de la Pole, 2nd Earl of Suffolk (1361–1415), a supporter of Henry IV and opponent of Richard. He regained his father's title on Henry's accession in 1399, and died at the Siege of Harfleur. 
Thomas de la Pole (1363–1415),
William de la Pole (born 1365),
Richard de la Pole (c. 13671402), ancestor of Cardinal Reginald Pole (1500–1558),
John de la Pole (c. 13691415),
Anne de la Pole (born c. 1373), widow of Sir Gerard de Lisle.  Anne married secondly Robert Thorley, Esq. and their daughter, Margaret Thorley, married Reginald West, 6th Baron De La Warr.  Thus, De la Pole was ancestor to Richard West, 7th Baron De La Warr who fought on the Lancastrian side in the Wars of the Roses and his son Thomas West, 8th Baron De La Warr (c. 145711 October 1525), a courtier and military commander during the reigns of Henry VII and Henry VIII.
Elizabeth de la Pole (born c. 1377)
Margaret de la Pole (born c. 1386)

See also
List of Lord Chancellors and Lord Keepers

Notes

External links
Fall of the de la Pole family 

|-

1330 births
1389 deaths

Year of birth uncertain
14th-century English Navy personnel
Lord chancellors of England
Michael
People from Mid Suffolk District
Michael
English financial businesspeople
People convicted in absentia
People convicted of treason against England
English admirals
Peers created by Edward III